Amorphoscelis nigriventer is a species of praying mantis found in Côte d'Ivoire, Ghana, and Guinea.

See also
List of mantis genera and species

References

Amorphoscelis
Mantodea of Africa
Insects described in 1930